Lanthanocephalus is a monotypic genus of coral in the subclassis Octocorallia. Lanthanocephalus clandestinus is the only species described, and is endemic to South Africa.

References 

Alcyoniidae
Monotypic cnidarian genera
Octocorallia genera